Guido Guinizelli (ca. 1225–1276) was an esteemed Italian love poet and is considered the "father" of the Dolce Stil Novo. He was the first to write in this new style of poetry writing, and thus is held to be the ipso facto founder. He was born in, and later exiled from, Bologna, Italy. It is speculated that he died in Verona, Italy.

Poetry 
Guinizelli's poetry can be briefly described as a conciliation between divine and earthly love with deep psychological introspection.  His major works are Al cor gentil rempaira sempre Amore (Within the gentle heart abideth Love), which Peter Dronke considers "perhaps the most influential love-song of the thirteenth century" (Dronke 1965, 57), as well as Io vogli[o] del ver la mia donna laudare and Vedut'ho la lucente stella Diana.

The main themes of the Dolce Stil Novo can be found in Guinizelli's Al cor gentil rempaira sempre amore: the angelic beauty of the beloved women, the comparison of nobility to the sun and the rampant use of topoi such as cor gentil and Amore.

Role in Dante's Divine Comedy

Purgatorio XI 
Guido Guinizelli appears twice in Dante Alighieri's Purgatorio. At first, he is briefly mentioned in Purgatorio XI, when Dante encounters the great Italian artist, Oderisi da Gubbio, on the terrace of Pride. While discussing the fleeting nature of fame and recognition, Oderisi refers to Guido Guinizelli and his successor, Guido Cavalcanti (ca. 1250–1300): Thus has one Guido taken from the other

the glory of our tongue, and he, perhaps, is born

who will drive one and then the other from the nest (Purgatorio XI. 97-99).

Purgatorio XXVI 
In Purgatorio XXVI, Dante journeys through the terrace of Lust, where he finally meets Guido Guinizelli. Like the other shades on this terrace, Guido is engulfed in flames to repent for his burning desires while alive. Once Guido reveals his identity, Dante narrates the awe and respect he has for the esteemed poet: when he gave his name and I knew he had been

father to me and to others, my betters,

who always used love's sweet and graceful rhymes (Purgatorio XXVI. 97-99).In this tercet, Dante refers to Guinizelli's influence on Italian poetry and the style of Dolce Stil Novo.

References

External links

 
 
 
 

1230 births
1276 deaths
Writers from Bologna
Guinizzelli
Italian-language poets